Podmo Patar Jol is a 2015 Bangladeshi Bengali language historical romantic drama film written by Latiful Islam and directed by Tonmoy Tansen. The film is produced by Sheikh Asifur Rahman, as his production company Tripod Films funded the project. The plot is based on a British colonial era story. It stars Emon, Bidya Sinha Saha Mim, Tariq Anam Khan and Amit Hasan in lead roles with Chitralekha Guho, Nima Rahman and Nipun appearing in supporting roles. The film was released on 18 July 2015.

Plot
The film takes place during the late 19th century in Bengal. During that period of time, Zaminders had absolute power and controlled every aspect of common people's lives. Rizwan is the only son of a very powerful Zaminder who resides in the rural part of Bengal. As Rizwan grows up, His father sends him away to the city for higher education, however Rizwan have no interest in heart to seek higher education as he aspires to become a great poet. As he progresses with his life in the city, one day his friends persuades him to go to a Baizi Bari's Jhumri Mahal, where all the Raqasa (Dancers) resides.

As he stays there for few days, He comes across a very graceful Baiji named Rupak. As he get to knows her, he falls in love with her although it is forbidden for Baiji's to  get involved in any kind of relationship and after all, He was a Zaminder and she was a dancer, but She also falls in love with him after all. Going opposite the social norm, many obstacles comes between them and overpowers their love. As they fails to unite in the time, both Rupak and Rizwan dies and reunites after death.

Cast
 Bidya Sinha Saha Mim as Phooleswari/Rupak, a Baizi Dancer and love interest of Rizwan.
 Emon as Rizwan, Son of a powerful zaminder who aspires to be a poet. He is in love with a Baizi dancer.
 Tariq Anam Khan, a powerful zaminder and father of Rizwan. He is very torturous and against Riwzan's romantic relation with Rupak.
 Chitralekha Guha, Mother of Rizwan who dislikes her husband's judgement but is too afraid to tell him.
 Nipun Akter, A Baizi dancer and friend of Rupak.
 Amit Hasan, the main antagonist who wants to marry Phooleswari. 
 Nima Rahman, as the guardian and key holder of Baizi Bari.
 Rumana Swarna
 Abu Hena Roni
 Nayan Khan
 Ananta Hira
 Pirzada Shahidul Harun

Production
The writer of the film Latiful Islam was inspired by the story of Baizi Bari; Tradition Dance House during British Colonial Era, set during late 1800 and early 1900 in Bengal. The film develops around a love tale during the colonial period. Shayan Chowdhury Arnob, Shironamhin , and Chirkut have composed the film soundtrack purely based on the theme of the period film is set on.

The film was shot in various place across Bangladesh. The film's principal photography began in mid 2013. The first schedule was shot at Tangail. The film was also done in Old Dhaka and few scenes were taken inside BFDC Studios in Dhaka. The film was shot for over four months.

The leading cast for the film Mamnun Hasan Emon and Mim Bidya Sinha Saha was finalised during 2012, However, due to few issues, the film was stalled until 2014. Padma Patar Jol is the second collaboration between Mamnun Hasan Emon and Mim Bidya Sinha Saha after Jonakir Aalo (2014).

Soundtrack
Music for the film was given by Ahmed Imtiaz Bulbul, S I Tutul, Shironamhin, Arnob, Adit Ozbert  and Chirkut. The lyrics are penned by Latiful Islam Shibli and Sharmin Sultana. The soundtrack album features numerous singer such as Nancy, Kona, Sabrina Porshi, Elita Karim, Arnob and others.

References

External links
 Film Website
 Facebook

2015 films
Bengali-language Bangladeshi films
Bangladeshi romantic drama films
Films set in Bangladesh
2010s historical romance films
Films set in the British Empire
Films set in the 19th century
Films set in the 20th century
Films scored by Ahmed Imtiaz Bulbul
Films scored by Adit Ozbert
Films scored by Arnob
Films scored by S I Tutul
Films scored by Chirkutt
Bangladeshi historical films
2010s Bengali-language films
Best Film Bachsas Award winners